Toece is a department or commune of Bazèga Province in central Burkina Faso. Its capital lies at the town of Toece. According to the 1996 census the department has a total population of 33,608  .

References

Departments of Burkina Faso
Bazèga Province